Zhou Wei Hui (born 4 January 1973), known simply by her Chinese given name Wei Hui, is a Chinese Post 70s Generation writer, living and working in Shanghai and New York City. Her novel Shanghai Baby (1999) was banned in the People's Republic of China as  "decadent". Her latest novel Marrying Buddha (2005) was censored, modified and published in China under a modified title. She is often associated with Mian Mian, another slightly older member of the "New Generation".

Early life and education
Zhou Weihui, known in English as Wei Hui, studied Chinese Language and Literature at Fudan University in Shanghai, after a year of military training.

Career
Her first short story was published at the age of 21. Her first novel Shanghai Baby, was a local bestseller in Shanghai. Soon after its publication, Shanghai Baby was banned by the Chinese government because of the novel's explicit sexual scenes and bold portrait of China's new generation. The publishing house that published the novel was temporarily closed for 3 months. Shanghai Baby was published overseas where it became an international bestseller. Shanghai Baby has been translated into 34 different languages and has sold over six million copies in 45 countries, more than any other work of Chinese contemporary literature. A German film adaptation of Shanghai Baby starring Bai Ling was released in 2007, but has not been released outside of film festivals.

Marrying Buddha, Weihui's second novel and a sequel to Shanghai Baby, was published in 2005 and became another international bestseller. Like Shanghai Baby, the novel is again narrated by Coco, a thinly disguised Wei Hui.  Coco is described by Weihui as a 'representative of socially and sexually liberated Chinese young women'. Marrying Buddha continues Coco's journey of self-discovery in terms of her sexuality.

Published works
Shanghai Baby 
Marrying Buddha
The Shriek of the Butterfly
 Virgin in the Water
Crazy Like Weihui
 Desire Pistol

Influence
Wei Hui has been regarded by international media as a spokeswoman of the new generation of Chinese young women. She has presented her work in a large number of Western and East Asian media and publications, including The New York Times, The New Yorker, Time, CNN, USA Today, the BBC, The Times, The Sunday Times, The Economist, Stern, Welt am Sonntag, Le Monde,  Le Figaro, Asahi Shimbun, NHK and Yomiuri Shimbun.

References

1973 births
Living people
Post 70s Generation
Writers from Ningbo
People from Yuyao
People's Republic of China novelists
Fudan University alumni
20th-century Chinese women writers
20th-century Chinese writers
21st-century Chinese women writers
21st-century Chinese writers
Chinese women novelists